Nobab Nondini (also spelled as Nabab Nandini) is a 2007 Romantic Bengali film directed by Haranath Chakraborty, story written by Anjan Choudhury. The film is starring Hiran, Koel Mallick, Ranjit Mallick, Sandhya Roy. This  movie is the debutant of Hiran.

Plot

Cast
 Hiran Chatterjee as Nabab
 Koel Mallick as Nandini, his beloved
 Ranjit Mallick as Rajat Bannerjee, his uncle, supposedly
 Sandhya Roy
 Tathoi Deb
 Anuradha Ray
 Ashok Kumar-II
 Sumanta Mukherjee
 Ramen Raychowdhury
 Sachin Mullik
 Sagnik Chatterjee

Soundtrack

Awards
Anandalok Best Action Hero Award 2008-Hiran Chatterjee

References

External links
  www.telegraphindia.com preview

2007 films
2000s Bengali-language films
Bengali-language Indian films
Films scored by Babul Bose
Films scored by Jeet Ganguly
Films directed by Haranath Chakraborty